Calliotropis carlotta is a species of sea snail, a marine gastropod mollusk in the family Eucyclidae.

Description
The shell can grow to be 10 mm in length.

Distribution
It can be found in Oregon and British Columbia.

References

External links
 To ITIS
 To World Register of Marine Species

carlotta
Gastropods described in 1902